The Rural Municipality of Hillsborough No. 132 is a rural municipality (RM) in the Canadian province of Saskatchewan within Census Division No. 7 and  Division No. 2. At 445.25 square kilometres in area, it is the smallest rural municipality in Saskatchewan.

History 
The RM of Hillsborough No. 132 incorporated as a rural municipality on January 1, 1913. True to the name, much of its landmass is occupied by rolling pasture land, as well as Old Wives Lake. Because of this, it has often historically been Saskatchewan's least populated rural municipality. Its count of 101 current inhabitants exceeds only Glen McPherson No. 46, which has 72.

Geography

Communities and localities 
The following unincorporated communities are within the RM.

Localities
Lillestrom
Old Wives
Orland

Demographics 

Government 
The RM of Hillsborough No. 132 is governed by an elected municipal council and an appointed administrator that meets on the second Tuesday of every month. The reeve of the RM is Don Tremblay while its administrator is Charlene Loos. The RM's office is located in Moose Jaw.

References 

H